Juan Carlos Falcón (born 19 November 1979) is an Argentine football midfielder.

Career
Falcón started his professional career in 1998 with Vélez Sársfield, where he played until 2002, making over 100 appearances for the club in the Argentine Primera División. In 2003, Falcón joined Mexican club Querétaro where he enjoyed the most productive spell of goalscoring in his career with 6 in 54 games.

In 2004, he returned to Argentina to play for Racing Club, but in 2005 he went back to Mexico to join Atlante. Two years later, in 2007, he joined Colón, and then again Racing Club, both in the Argentine Primera.

After playing one season with Defensa y Justicia in the Primera B Nacional, Falcón returned to the top division in 2011 signing for Godoy Cruz.

Honours
Vélez Sársfield
Argentine Primera División (1): 1998 Clausura

External links
 Statistics at Irish Times
 Statistics at BDFA 
 
 

1979 births
Living people
Sportspeople from Buenos Aires Province
Argentine footballers
Argentine expatriate footballers
Association football midfielders
Club Atlético Vélez Sarsfield footballers
Racing Club de Avellaneda footballers
Atlante F.C. footballers
Querétaro F.C. footballers
Club Atlético Colón footballers
Defensa y Justicia footballers
Godoy Cruz Antonio Tomba footballers
Argentine Primera División players
Liga MX players
Expatriate footballers in Mexico